Nagolny is a rural locality (a khutor) in Nikolskoye 1-ye Rural Settlement, Vorobyovsky District, Voronezh Oblast, Russia. The population was 134 as of 2010. There are 2 streets.

Geography 
Nagolny is located 41 km east of Vorobyovka (the district's administrative centre) by road. Iskra is the nearest rural locality.

References 

Rural localities in Vorobyovsky District